Randy Phillips (born 1990) used social media to reveal his homosexuality while serving in the U.S. military.

Randy Phillips may also refer to:

 Randy Phillips (soccer) (born 1959), American soccer player
 Randy Phillips (American football) (born 1987), American football safety
 Randy Phillips (politician) (born 1950), member of the Alaska Legislature from 1977 to 2003
 Randy Phillips (music producer), president of Anschutz Entertainment Group
 Randy Phillips, Texas pastor, member of the musical group Phillips, Craig and Dean